Leonid Smirnov may refer to:

 Leonid Smirnov (politician) (1916–2001), Soviet politician and engineer
 Leonid Smirnov (footballer) (1889–1980), Russian footballer